The 2018 Winn Rentals World Mixed Curling Championship was held from October 13 to 20 at the Kelowna Curling Club in Kelowna, Canada.

Teams

Round-robin standings
Final standings

Playoffs

{{#invoke:RoundN|main|columns=4|3rdplace=yes
|skipmatch = 1;4;5;8
|RD1 = Qualification
|omit_blanks=yes
|||4||7|||9||5
|||7||5
|||7||8
|||6||4
|||8||5
|||6||4
|||2||11|||3||7
|||6||2
|||6||2
|||7||8'}}

QualificationOctober 19, 2:00pm''

Quarter-finals

Semi-finals

Third place

Final

References

External links

World Mixed Curling Championship
2018 in Canadian curling
2018 in British Columbia
Curling in British Columbia
Sport in Kelowna
International curling competitions hosted by Canada
World Mixed Curling Championship